Dhayanidhi Azhagiri is an Indian Tamil cinema producer and distributor. He is the owner of the Cloud Nine Movies banner. His grandfather is M. Karunanidhi, the former Chief Minister of Tamil Nadu. His father is M. K. Alagiri, the former Minister of Chemicals and Fertilizers.

Personal life

Dayanidhi married Chennai-based Advocate Anusha on 18 November 2010.
They have a first son named Rudra Dev and a second son named Vedanth

Controversy

A case has been filed against Dayanidhi in connection with an estimated Rs.16,000 crore mining scam. His bank accounts have been frozen, a look out notice has been issued against him and he is also being looked for by the Immigration Department. He has been absconding.
A district court in Madurai has issued a non bailable warrant against Dayanidhi in connection with the illegal granite quarrying scam. All his relatives have claimed ignorance about his whereabouts. TN police is contemplating to declare him as a proclaimed offender.

Filmography

Awards
International Tamil Film Awards (ITFA)
 Best Producer - Mankatha

See also
 Cloud Nine Movies

References

Tamil film producers
Living people
Film producers from Chennai
Dravida Munnetra Kazhagam politicians
Karunanidhi family
Year of birth missing (living people)